The 1987 U.S. Clay Court Championships was a Grand Prix men's tennis tournament held in Indianapolis, Indiana in the United States. It was the 19th edition of the tournament held in the open era and the last in Indianapolis. First-seeded Mats Wilander won the singles title.

The tournament was moved to a summer date (July 13–19) after the previous year's spring event failed to attract top male players. The revised date clashed with the scheduled Virginia Slims of Newport so there was no women's event in 1987.

Finals

Singles

 Mats Wilander defeated  Kent Carlsson 7–5, 6–3
 It was Wilander's 5th singles title of the year and the 26th of his career.

Doubles

 Laurie Warder /  Blaine Willenborg defeated  Joakim Nyström /  Mats Wilander 6–0, 6–3

References

External links 
 ITF tournament edition details

 
U.S. Clay Court Championships
U.S. Clay Court Championships
U.S. Clay Court Championships
U.S. Clay Court Championships